Air Vice Marshal Barbara Ann Courtney,  is a senior officer in the Royal Australian Air Force. A Joint Battlefield Airspace Controller, Courtney has commanded Multi National Base Tarin Kot (2011–12), United Nations Command–Rear (2014–16), and the Surveillance and Response Group RAAF (2019–21). She has served on operations in the Solomon Islands, Afghanistan and Iraq, and was Deputy Commander, Joint Task Force 633 on Operation Accordion from 2018 to 2019. Courtney was appointed Head Royal Commission Defence and Veteran Suicide Taskforce in 2021.

References

Air traffic controllers
Australian military personnel of the Iraq War
Australian military personnel of the War in Afghanistan (2001–2021)
Female air marshals of the Royal Australian Air Force
Foreign recipients of the Legion of Merit
Living people
Members of the Order of Australia
Year of birth missing (living people)